Marc Rodgers (born  March 16, 1972) is a Canadian former professional ice hockey player. He played 21 games in the National Hockey League with the Detroit Red Wings during the 1999–00 season. The rest of his career, which lasted from 1992 to 2003, was mainly spent in the minor leagues.

Biography
Rodgers was born in Shawville, Quebec. As a youth, he played in the 1985 and 1986 Quebec International Pee-Wee Hockey Tournaments with the Hull Olympiques minor ice hockey team. He later played 21 games in the National Hockey League with the Detroit Red Wings.

Career statistics

Regular season and playoffs

References

External links

1972 births
Living people
Adirondack Red Wings players
Anglophone Quebec people
Canadian expatriate ice hockey players in Germany
Canadian expatriate ice hockey players in the United States
Canadian ice hockey right wingers
Chicago Wolves (IHL) players
Cincinnati Mighty Ducks players
Detroit Red Wings players
Granby Bisons players
Ice hockey people from Quebec
Knoxville Cherokees players
Knoxville Speed players
Las Vegas Thunder players
Manitoba Moose (IHL) players
People from Outaouais
Quebec Rafales players
Schwenninger Wild Wings players
Undrafted National Hockey League players
Utah Grizzlies (IHL) players
Verdun Collège Français players
Wheeling Thunderbirds players